Trumaine Johnson (born January 16, 1960) is a retired American football player who played in the National Football League and the United States Football League.

Career
Johnson was selected by the Chicago Blitz of the United States Football League in the 1983 USFL Draft after a college football career at Grambling State University.

Johnson caught a league leading 81 passes for a league leading 1327 yards with 10 touchdowns in his rookie season with the Blitz. He was named to the USFL All-Star team.

In 1984, Johnson played for the Arizona Wranglers and caught 90 passes for 1258 yards with 13 touchdowns. He was again named to the USFL All-Star team.

He then switched to the National Football League in 1985 and played for the San Diego Chargers as a reserve wide receiver for the next two seasons. He joined the Buffalo Bills in 1987 and had his biggest NFL season there in 1988 when he caught 38 passes for 528 yards. He retired after that season.

Career stats
USFL
Catches - 171
Yards - 2585
Touchdowns - 23
Yards Per Catch - 15.1

References

External links
 Ebony Magazine Article

American football wide receivers
1960 births
Living people
People from Bogalusa, Louisiana
Players of American football from Louisiana
Chicago Blitz players
Arizona Wranglers players
Grambling State Tigers football players
Buffalo Bills players
San Diego Chargers players